Mort Castle (born 1946) is an American horror author and writing teacher, with more than 500 short stories and 17 books to his credit, including Cursed Be the Child (Leisure Books, 1994) and The Strangers. Castle's first novel was published in 1967. Since then he has had pieces published in all sorts of places ranging from traditional literary magazines to more off-the-wall or risqué markets.  He has been nominated eleven times for the Bram Stoker Award for Short Fiction and was winner three times.

A dedicated writing teacher, Castle has been a working musician, a standup comic, a stage hypnotist, a high school English teacher (for 11 years), and a magazine and comic book editor. He is currently writer-in-residence for two high schools, and teaching "Researching and Writing Historical Fiction" and "Story In Graphic Form" and other classes at Columbia College Chicago.  He is a frequent keynote speaker at writing conferences, and has given over 1000 presentations to writers, would-be writers, and teachers of writing. One of his latest books, Writing Horror, for which he served as editor, has become the "bible" for aspiring  horror authors. It also includes interviews with some of horror's top stars, such as Stephen King. Castle is also the Executive Editor of Thorby Comics, and currently fiction editor for Doorways Magazine.

Castle has been a regular contributor to Eureka Productions' Graphic Classics series since 2006, with work in Graphic Classics: Jack London, (second edition), Graphic Classics: Ambrose Bierce (second edition), Graphic Classics: Bram Stoker (second edition), Graphic Classics: Robert Louis Stevenson (second edition), Graphic Classics: O. Henry, and Graphic Classics: Halloween Classics.

In August 2013 it was announced that Castle will be scripting the Red Giant Entertainment comic book Darchon, an ongoing feature of their Giant-Size Comics line of free print comic book titles set to debut on May 3, 2014, as part of Free Comic Book Day.  Darchon will appear monthly in Giant-Size Thrills, their horror-focused title.

Mort Castle's short story, Oval Portrait, was published in 3Elements Literary Review's fall issue no. 8, in October 2015.

Awards 
Castle has been nominated for various awards, including the Pushcart Prize, the Bram Stoker Award (which he won three times), the DeMarco Prize, and the Emerson Fiction Award, Leaders in the Arts for Chicago.

Bibliography

Novels
 In Memoriam: Papa, Blake and HPL
 The Deadly Election (1976)
 The Strangers (1984)
 Cursed Be the Child (1990)

Collections
 So Many Tomorrows: Three Stories About Children
 Moon on the Water (2000)
 Nations of the Living, Nations of the Dead (2002)
 New Moon on the Water (announced by the now defunct Full Moon Press for 2010, currently being published by DarK Regions Press)
 Knowing When to Die (2018)

Anthologies edited
 Nukes: Four Horror Writers on the Ultimate Horror : Stories (1986)
 Shadow Show: All-New Stories in Celebration of Ray Bradbury with Sam Weller (2012)
 "All American Horror of the 21st Century"

Non fiction
 Writing Horror: A Handbook by the Horror Writers Association (1997)
 "Writer's Digest Annotated Classics: Dracula"

See also
List of horror fiction authors

References

External links
 
Bibliography

Interviews
 One Woman's Writing Retreat: Interview
 A Conversation With Mort Castle
 Glass House Interview
 A Deep Blue Interview with a Writing Guru
 Barrantes, Guillermo y Martín Valiente. "Reportaje a Mort Castle," Boletín (Nov. 2003) [Spanish]

American horror writers
American fantasy writers
American comics writers
20th-century American novelists
1946 births
Living people
American male novelists
20th-century American male writers